The Bayer designations h Velorum and H Velorum are distinct. Due to technical limitations, both designations link here. For the star
h Velorum, see HD 75630
H Velorum, see HD 76805

Velorum, h
Vela (constellation)